Frederic Mull Crawford (July 8, 1883 – June 12, 1953) was the head coach for the William & Mary Tribe men's basketball team from 1907 to 1911. Over his four years as coach, Crawford guided the Tribe to a 12–11 record.

Head coaching record

References

1883 births
1953 deaths
Basketball coaches from North Carolina
William & Mary Tribe athletic directors
William & Mary Tribe men's basketball coaches
Columbia University alumni
University of North Carolina at Chapel Hill alumni
People from Lee County, North Carolina